Karrer is a lunar impact crater that is located in the southern hemisphere on the far side of the Moon. It lies to the northeast of the crater Minkowski, and south of Leavitt.

The most notable feature of this crater is the dark-hued floor, created when the interior was resurfaced by lava flows that had a lower albedo than the surrounding terrain. The outer rim is nearly circular, but broken in the northeast by a smaller overlapping crater. The inner wall has the same albedo as the surrounding terrain, and marks the perimeter of the flooded floor. The rim is somewhat worn, particularly in the north next to the overlapping crater. On the floor is a lobate scarp that was formed as a result of contraction of the lava. The scarp extends southward across the middle of the crater, past the rim and onto the surrounding highlands.

References

Sources

 
 
 
 
 
 
 
 
 
 
 
 

Impact craters on the Moon